Cranborne Boys High School is a day high school located in Cranborne, an eastern suburb of Harare, Zimbabwe. It is an all-boys school established on a former British RAF base.

The schools motto is "Nitamur ad caelum" which is Latin for "taking to the sky". Its sister school is Hatfield Girls High School which is located in Hatfield, Harare. The headmaster of the school is Mr Masenga.

Buildings

Main block 
Caters for the form one to form four category and also holds the senior masters' office.

Advanced level block 
As the name suggests, the block caters only for the advanced level pupils studying for A-Levels, with no O-Level pupils allowed.

Laboratories 
This block stands adjacent to the main block. It contains one senior and four junior laboratories.

Technical block 
For the technical subjects offered by the school
Technical graphics
Metal work
Wood work
Art

Hall and gym & kitchen 
These stand joined together; the gym has an indoor basketball court and hockey ground.

Grounds 
The school has 4 grounds referred to as fields.
 The Rugby field (John Brown Field)
 The Soccer field
 The Cricket field
 The Volleyball Court
 Baseball Field
 Field Hockey
 Athletics Field
 Hand ball

Sport 
The school offers a wide variety of sporting disciplines, including soccer, cricket, basketball, hockey, swimming, table tennis, athletics, volleyball, squash, and rugby.

References

Boys' high schools in Zimbabwe